Holia is an extinct genus of trilobite in the order Phacopida. It contains four species, H. cimelia, H. glabra, H. secristi, and H. anacantha.

External links
 Holia at the Paleobiology Database

Cheiruridae
Devonian trilobites
Fossils of Argentina
Paleozoic life of the Northwest Territories
Phacopida genera